The 2016–17 North Superleague was the sixteenth staging of the North Superleague, the highest tier of league competition in the North Region of the Scottish Junior Football Association. The season began on 2 August 2016.

Member clubs for the 2016–17 season
Banks O' Dee were the reigning champions and entered the 2016–17 Scottish Cup.

North First Division (West) and (East) champions Buckie Rovers and Colony Park replace the automatically relegated Ellon United and F.C. Stoneywood.

Bridge of Don Thistle changed their name to Newburgh Thistle at the conclusion of the 2015–16 season.

In November 2016, Deveronside relocated to a new stadium at the Myrus Centre in Macduff from their old Canal Park ground in Banff.

League table
The relegation play-off format was altered as a result of the North First Division (West) champions, Spey Valley United, declining promotion to the North Superleague. Previously, the bottom two Superleague clubs were automatically relegated with the club finishing in third bottom position, tabled to play-off against the winner of a tie between the two runners-up of the North First Division (East) and (West).

In the revised plan, only the bottom club in the North Superleague will be automatically relegated. The runners-up to Spey Valley United, Montrose Roselea, will play-off at a neutral venue against the club finishing second bottom of the Superleague. The runners-up in the North First Division (East), Sunnybank, have played-off against the club finishing third bottom of the North Superleague, with the Superleague club having home advantage in the tie.

Results

Superleague play-offs

References

External links
 North Region JFA

North Superleague
SJFA North Region Superleague seasons